Kantar Worldpanel (formerly TNS Worldpanel) is an international company dealing in consumer knowledge and insights based on continuous consumer panels. Kantar Worldpanel is a part of the London headquartered market research company Kantar Group.

Kantar Worldpanel has a team of 3,500 people and services covering 60 countries with direct ownership or through partners. They work in fields such as fast-moving consumer goods, impulse products, beauty and personal care, fashion, baby, telecommunications and entertainment.

History 

Kantar Worldpanel's first panels were founded in the 1940s by companies like Attwood Statistics Limited in the UK (1948) and Secodip in France (1969). The latter soon started to expand their coverage, firstly to Spain in 1973 and afterwards to Portugal in 1989.

In the 1970s and the 1980s, other companies also started creating new panels. In 1976 Taylor Nelson launched the first usage panel for food and drinks in the UK. In 1980 NFO created a usage panel for beverages in the United States. And in 1985, IBOPE launched a consumer panel in Brazil (1985).

In the 1990s the consolidation and development of the consumer panels network accelerated. In the UK, AGB and Taylor Nelson merged to create Taylor Nelson AGB in 1991, so bringing purchase and usage panels into the same company. In France, Sofres acquired Secodip in 1992 and soon started planning the development of new consumer panels in Asia and Latin America. Both groups came together in 1997 when Taylor Nelson AGB and Sofres merged to create Taylor Nelson Sofres (TNS). All consumer panels were then taken into a specific division that in 2003 started using the TNS Worldpanel brand.

While all these corporate movements were taking place, the network expanded across different regions. In Asia, between 1997 and 2002, six new consumer panels were developed and launched using the Frank Small Associates' network that Secodip had bought in 1995. The first launch took place in Taiwan in 1997. Two years after, in 1999, Korea and Thailand were added to the network, and Philippines and Malaysia then joined in 2000 followed by Vietnam in 2002. Meanwhile, In China, TNS began a partnership in 1999 with local research company CVSC, who had started a panel two years earlier. In 2001, TNS and the parent company of CVSC formed a new joint venture company called CTR (CVSC TNS Research) and the consumer panel in China joined the Worldpanel network.

In Latin America, after the first Secodip panel launch in Argentina in 1996, a partnership between IBOPE and NDP launched another new panel in Chile in 1998. In 2000, IBOPE, NPD and TNS created the LatinPanel joint venture, representing the existing Brazil, Argentina and Chile operations. The acquisition of Samimp added the existing panels in Peru and Bolivia to LatinPanel in 2002. In 2004 TNS acquired two additional companies, Data in Central America and CIMA in Colombia and Venezuela, bringing their consumer panels into the regional network. Finally, Ecuador and Mexico panels were also built and launched in 2004 and 2005 respectively, consolidating LatinPanel business in the region. In 2007 TNS became owner of LatinPanel to bring together the Latin American network with Worldpanel in other regions.

In North America, as a result of the Taylor Nelson Sofres' acquisition of NFO in 2003, the beverages usage panel was incorporated to the group. In 2006, TNS Worldpanel reinforced its presence in the US with a new personal care usage panel.

In 2008 TNS was bought by WPP, which resulted in the strategic decision to create a stand-alone company focused on consumer panels and branded Kantar Worldpanel.

The initial focus on fast-moving consumer goods was later widened to increase the number of sectors covered. Now Kantar Worldpanel measures fashion, telecommunications, entertainment and fuel among other products. The range of methodologies has also been transformed from traditional mail questionnaires to a wider range including bar-code scanners, internet and SMS.  The company developed its first international panel (Worldpanel Comtech) in 2006 and the delivery tool Worldpanel Online in 2010.

In 2011, a new panel in Indonesia was launched. In 2012, a new strategic tie up with another Kantar company, IMRB, lead to the integration of their consumer panel in India into the Worldpanel network. In 2013, Kantar Worldpanel expanded into Africa, launching panels in Nigeria and Kenya through another alliance with TNS-RMS and Ghana will be launched in 2014.

References

Market research companies of the United Kingdom
Companies established in 1997
WPP plc